The University of London Press (also known as UoL Press) is a publishing house that is part of the University of London. Based in the School of Advanced Study at Senate House, it "seeks to facilitate collaborative, inclusive, open access interchange, within and beyond the academy."

History

The University of London Press was originally established in 1910. From 1949 to 1979 it was known as Athlone Press.

In 2019, the University of London Press was relaunched as an open access publisher specialising in "distinctive scholarship at the forefront of the Humanities."

Publishing
The University of London Press publishes books and journals by the following institutes of the School of Advanced Study:

Institute of Advanced Legal Studies
Institute of Classical Studies
Institute of Commonwealth Studies
Institute of English Studies
Institute of Historical Research
Institute of Latin American Studies
Institute of Modern Languages Research
Warburg Institute

References

External links

UoL Press Open Access Titles at the Humanities Digital Library
UoL Press Open Access Journals

Book publishing companies based in London
University presses of the United Kingdom